Roy Kendall (9 June 1899 – 9 March 1972) was an English-born Australian politician and intelligence officer for the British Secret Intelligence Service.

Born in London, he was educated at Bristol Cathedral School before becoming a merchant seaman. After serving in the Royal Naval Reserve from 1914 to 1918, he was recruited by Britain's Secret Intelligence Service (MI6) in December 1941 for the purpose of "penetrating the Japanese Mandated Islands or other areas in the Pacific". He was "vouched for" by the Australian director of naval intelligence, and in 1942 was appointed head of Secret Intelligence Australia, a branch of MI6 in Australia, reporting directly to Winston Churchill.

After the war, he became a newsagent in Brisbane, Australia. In 1949, he was elected to the Australian Senate as a Liberal senator. He remained in the Senate until retiring in 1964. Kendall died in 1972.

References 

1899 births
1972 deaths
Liberal Party of Australia members of the Parliament of Australia
Members of the Australian Senate for Queensland
Members of the Australian Senate
Royal Navy officers of World War II
Secret Intelligence Service personnel
Australian spies
British emigrants to Australia
20th-century Australian politicians
Royal Naval Reserve personnel